Philhelius citrofasciatus is a species of hoverfly found in grasslands from Ireland to western Siberia. The larvae live in ant Lasius colonies where they feed on the aphids tended by the ants. Prior to 2018, it was known under the genus name Xanthogramma, a junior synonym.

Description
External images
For terms see Morphology of Diptera Wing length 6·5–10·25 mm. Legs yellow coxae and trochanters black. Femora and tibiae 3 completely pale. Yellow marks on tergite 2 linear (not equilateral triangles). Tergites 2–4 with subequal yellow marks.
See references for determination.

Distribution
Palearctic. South Norway to Iberia. Ireland East through Central Europe and South Europe into European Russia and Yugoslavia and the Caucasus, then to Siberia.

References

Syrphinae
Diptera of Asia
Diptera of Europe
Insects described in 1776
Taxa named by Charles De Geer